Tahuna Irwin (born 8 May 1997) is a New Zealand former professional darts player who plays in Professional Darts Corporation events.

Darts Career
Irwin qualified for the 2018 Auckland Darts Masters, where lost 6–3 to Peter Wright in the first round. A few days later, he won the New Zealand Open, defeating Deon Toki 6–4 in the final.

Irwin qualified for the 2019 PDC World Darts Championship by winning the DPNZ qualifier, defeating Craig Ross 7–2 in the final. He also qualified for the 2018 PDC World Youth Championship. However, due to an immigration error, he was unable to enter the United Kingdom for the Youth Championship, or subsequently, the World Championship.

Irwin Quit of the PDC in May 2021.

References

External links

1997 births
Living people
New Zealand darts players
Professional Darts Corporation associate players